FK Austria Wien played the 2020–21 season in the Austrian Bundesliga and Austrian Cup.

Review and events
Austria Wien's season started in the Austrian Cup with a 5–0 win against SC Retz on 30 August 2020. The match was played without spectators due to the COVID-19 pandemic. Austria Wien defeated Wiener Sport-Club in the second round and TSV Hartberg in the round of 16 before getting knocked out by Red Bull Salzburg in the Quarter–finals.

Austria Wien's first Bundesliga match was a 1–0 loss to LASK in Linz on 11 September 2020. Unlike the first round of the Austrian Cup, Matchday one had spectators. Austria Wien's first win happened on matchday two against SV Ried. After defeating Ried, Austria Wien won only one out of their next 10 league matches. The one win was against WSG Tirol. The first match between Austria Wien and Red Bull Salzburg happened in Vienna on 24 October 2020. Red Bull Salzburg won the match 2–0. With the loss, Austria Wien dropped down to sixth place in the league table. The loss to Red Bull Salzburg started an eight match winless streak. The first Wien derby took place at Allianz Stadion in Vienna on 29 November 2020. Austria Wien remained in eighth place. On 5 December 2020, Austria Wien lost 4–0 to Sturm Graz. Austria Wien remained in eighth place. Wolfsberger AC defeated Austria Wien 3–2 on 13 December 2020. Alon Turgeman gave Austria Wien a 1–0 lead in the first minute. But Michael Liendl scored from the penalty spot late in the match to give Wolfsberg a 3–2 lead. With the loss, Austria Wien dropped down to ninth place. 20 December 2020, Austria Wien and LASK drew 1–1. The draw sent Austria Wien down to 10th place in the league table. The last time Austria Wien was this low in the table was Matchday 1. On 23 January 2021, Austria Wien defeated Ried 1–0. The win finished the 8 match winless streak and moved Austria Wien up to ninth place. Austria Wien defeated Admira Wacker 4–0 with goals from Benedikt Pichler, Georg Teigl and two goals from Johannes Handl. Austria Wien faced Red Bull Salzburg twice in four days. On 6 February 2021, Austria Wien lost 2–0 in the quarter-finals of the Austrian Cup. Then on 10 February 2021, Austria Wien lost 3–1 in the Bundesliga. Austria Wien defeated Rheindorf Altach 5–1 on 20 February 2021. The second Wien Derby of the season took place on 7 March 2021. The match finished in a 0–0 draw. On 10 April 2021, Peter Stöger announced that he is leaving Austria Wien in the summer.

Match results

Legend

Bundesliga

Austrian Cup

Player details

|}

References

FK Austria Wien seasons
Austria Wien season